Seacoast United Phantoms (NPSL) were an American soccer team based in Hampton, New Hampshire, United States. Founded in 2010, the team played home games primarily out of Portsmouth High School.

History
Seacoast United Phantoms were announced as the pinnacle of the development pyramid for the Seacoast United Soccer Club in 2010 and began play in the National Premier Soccer League in 2011. The team was founded following the dissolution of the New Hampshire Mountaineers, which operated in the NPSL for only one season in 2010.

With the expansion of the broader Seacoast United Soccer Club organization into neighboring Maine, the Phantoms welcomed rivals Seacoast United Mariners into the Northeast-Atlantic Division of the NPSL in 2012.

Players

Year-by-year

Staff
 Corlton Simmond – Head Coach (2012 - 2016)
 Alex Ryan (2016–present)

References

Association football clubs established in 2010
National Premier Soccer League teams
2010 establishments in New Hampshire
Soccer clubs in New Hampshire